Frigga may refer to:
 An anglicized form of the Old Norse goddess name Frigg
 Frigga (character), a fictional Marvel Comics character based on the Norse goddess 
 Frigga (spider), a genus of jumping spiders
 77 Frigga, an asteroid
 A music project by artist Sasha Siem